Sir William Ramsay School is a co-educational secondary school in Hazlemere, Buckinghamshire. It takes children from the age of 11 through to the age of 18 with a total of approximately 1,180 pupils attending. The school shares a common catchment area with the nearby Holmer Green Senior School.

History
The school was founded in 1976, and named after Nobel Prize winning scientist Sir William Ramsay, who lived in Hazlemere until his death in 1916. Each year has six forms, though, during 2015/16 a 7th form was introduced due to the increase of students attending the school. Sir William Ramsay has three houses; Blake, Nash and Hepworth. Each house has its own colour with Blake being blue, Nash, red and Hepworth green. Each form is an individual house. In September 2012 Mr Mark Mayne took over from Miss Gaynor Comber as head teacher. He later left in July 2016 and was replaced by deputy headteacher Mr Chris Carter as Acting Headteacher. Mrs Christine McLintock then took over as headteacher from September 2017.

It was awarded specialist school status as a Visual Arts College by the Department for Education and Skills in September 2000.

In 2007, the school opened a multi-million pound performing arts centre. The first performance given by pupils was the musical Grease.

In August 2011 the school became an Academy.

In 2016, the school received £4m from the Government to build an extension, which has 3 new science labs, a lift, 8 maths rooms and a new Sixth Form centre. This was officially opened by Leigh-Anne-Pinnock, ex-pupil and Little Mix star when the school reopened in 2017.

In 2022, the school's headteacher, Christine McLintock, announced her resignation and was succeeded by Mr Paul Ramsey. McLintock remained as the school's Executive Headteacher until July 2022.

Controversies
On 9 January 2004, a fifteen-year-old pupil stabbed a fellow pupil after she intervened when he threatened his ex-girlfriend with a seven-inch steak knife.

On the morning of 27 January 2007, two men entered the school and were regarded as suspicious. Pupils were held in classrooms and the school was placed on lockdown while a police helicopter and canine team searched the surrounding area. Two men were later arrested.

Uniform

All pupils wear a navy blue tie with the new mixed circle crest, along side a white shirt, navy jumper or cardigan (optional) and a navy blazer with the school crest on the left pocket. Girls can either wear a box pleat dark grey skirt or dark grey tailored trousers. Boys wear dark grey tailored trousers. Boys must wear grey or black socks and girls must wear black or white socks.
For P.E., boys can either wear the aqua and navy airflow P.E. shirt or the school rugby navy shirt. They can wear this with crested shorts or a crested/navy tracksuit. Girls also wear the Aqua and navy airflow P.E. top with either crested shorts, a crested skort, navy sport legins or a crested/navy tracksuit. In football, they must wear the navy and Aqua SWR football socks and for hockey and rugby, they must wear a mouth guard.

Facilities

Ramsay has a recently built drama building containing media and music classrooms and private practising rooms. It also has a lift for anyone with a disability, the school assembly hall and classrooms for languages. The science and math block has 18 classrooms in total, 10 for science and 8 for Maths, there is a lift included. The rest of the school is one level. There is also a building each for ICT, art technologies and humanities, 2 buildings for English, a sports hall, fitness studio and tennis courts for P.E. There is also a canteen, a drama theatre, a hearing impaired unit, a disabled unit and a playing field.

Curriculum
On starting at the school, year sevens get to do Spanish which is usually different from primary schools. All lessons are one hour long and follow a two-week timetable, with essential lessons, e.g. Maths, English and Science featuring the most. GCSEs are chosen in year 9 with Maths, Science, English, P.E. and PSHE as compulsory subjects. The school offers four techs; Textiles, Resistant Materials, Engineering and Food Tech. The school also offers many extra curriculum clubs.

Disabled, special needs and hearing impaired pupils
The school has a unit for deaf pupils, known as the HARP and a unit for disabled and special needs pupils known as the SEN. The majority of the school is on one level and has many ramps making it helpful for disabled pupils. The pupils enrolled in the SEN and HARP are often merged into an ordinary classroom with an LSA, so are also registered on the normal register, though they may go back to SEN occasionally instead of doing a lesson. 
SEN pupils may also sometimes do private lessons in subjects with only a few other pupils who are also struggling with that lesson. Those pupils are not necessarily always SEN.

Notable alumni
 Adam Paul Harvey, actor who played Tom Brake in Night and Day, Ralph Henshaw in Bedtime and Nathan Boothe in Where the Heart Is. More recently he has acted in two films: My Brother Tom (2001) and Son of Rambow (2007).
 Leigh-Anne Pinnock, former Head Girl and member of X Factor 2011 winners ''Little Mix.

References 

Secondary schools in Buckinghamshire
High Wycombe
Academies in Buckinghamshire
Educational institutions established in 1976